PoorMan is a light-weight web server bundled with the BeOS and Haiku operating system.

External links 
 How to use PoorMan
 PoorGuy is a windows clone of PoorMan

BeOS
Web server software